American Football (also known as LP3) is the eponymous third studio album by American rock band American Football, released on March 22, 2019 through Polyvinyl and Big Scary Monsters.

American Football is the third self-titled album by American Football and the second release since their reunion in 2014.

Background 
On December 11, 2018, The first single from the album, "Silhouettes", was released, along with the band teasing a third project on Instagram, and the listing for a third self-titled album appearing on Apple Music. A music video for "Silhouettes" was released on January 8, 2019. Later that month, the band released a new single, "Uncomfortably Numb", which references the similarly titled song by Pink Floyd and features vocals from Paramore vocalist Hayley Williams. It was released with an accompanying music video, starring former Workaholics star Blake Anderson and pro skater Paul Rodriguez. This is their first album to not feature the "American Football house" on any cover or the artwork, as they did on their first two albums.

Reception
American Football was met with highly positive reviews. At Metacritic, which assigns a normalized rating out of 100 to reviews from mainstream publications, the album received an average score of 80, based on 14 reviews.

Track listing 
Track listing information obtained through Apple Music.

Personnel 
American Football
Steve Holmes – guitar
Steve Lamos – drums, trumpet
Mike Kinsella – vocals, guitar
Nate Kinsella – bass, glockenspiel

Additional personnel
Jason "Jake" Cupp – production
Rachel Goswell – vocals
Elizabeth Powell – vocals
Hayley Williams – vocals

Charts

References 

2019 albums
American Football (band) albums
Polyvinyl Record Co. albums